Ramajogayya Sastry (born 24 August 1970) is an Indian film lyricist, known for his works in Telugu cinema and music.

Early life
Ramajogayya Sastry was born in Arepalli Muppalla, Ipuru Mandal near Narasaraopet of Guntur district. His father, Suryaprakasa Rao, was a priest and agriculturist and his mother Saraswatamma is a housewife. He did his B.Tech. from REC Warangal and M.Tech. from IIT Kharagpur.

Career
He was working as a metallic engineer at Bengaluru when his career as a lyricist began. He worked in GE India Business Center in Secunderabad.

Career as a lyricist
Sastry penned lyrics for over a hundred films in Telugu and is a famous lyricist in Andhra Pradesh. He is popular for his peppy and catchy lyrics, while he has frequently shown his ability to write lyrics for more serious situations in films. He fancied becoming a singer.

He first penned lyrics for a Kannada film. Film Star V. Ravichandran introduced him to Krishna Vamsi who in turn introduced him to Sirivennela Sitaramasastri. Upon Sastry's request, Seetharama Shastri accepted him as his protégé thus enabling him to hone his lyric-writing skills. Sastry first penned lyrics for the movie Yuvasena, a remake of the Malayalam film 4 The People. He got Rs.20000 as first remuneration for his two songs in the film.

Actor-producer Mohan Babu and film director Srinu Vaitla offered Sastry to work in many of their films before he rose to stardom with the song "Om Namaste Bolo" in the film Ready. He won Filmfare award for the devotional song Sadaasiva Sanyaasii! from the film Khaleja.

He played a short and uncredited role in King as a music assistant for a music director Jayasurya played by Brahmanandam.

He won a music award from the Telugu channel Star Maa for lyrics of the song "Apple Beauty" from the movie Janatha Garage. He also penned the title song Jayaho Janatha for the same movie which was released in 2016. He then worked for Pawan Kalyan's Katamarayudu title song "Mira Mira Meesam" for which Anup Rubens composed the soundtrack.

Filmography 
{| class="wikitable"
|- style="background:#CCC; text-align:center;"
! Year !! Films !! Notes
|-
|2022
|Bheemla Nayak, Ghani, RRR, K.G.F: Chapter 2 (Dubbed Version), Prince (Dubbed version), Captain (Dubbed version), Aa Ammayi Gurinchi Meeku Cheppali, Ori Devuda
|
|-
|2021
|Krack, Vakeel Saab, Acharya, Naga Bhairavi (TV series), Intiki Deepam Illalu (TV series), Thalaivii (Dubbed version), Raja Vikramarka, Gaali Sampath
|
|-
| 2020  || Ala Vaikunthapurramuloo, Sarileru Neekevvaru, Yuvarathnaa
|
|-
| 2019  || Mr. KK (Dubbed version), Vinaya Vidheya Rama, Viswasam,  Donga
|
|-
| 2018 || Vishwaroopam II (Dubbed version), Next Enti?, Amar Akbar Anthony, Savyasachi, Aravinda Sametha Veera Raghava, Bharat Ane Nenu, Naa Peru Surya, Naa Illu India, Mahanati, Sammohanam, K.G.F: Chapter 1(Dubbed Version)|
|-
| 2017 || Khaidi No. 150, Oye Ninne, Jai Lava Kusa, Duvvada Jagannadham, Spyder (film), Om Namo Venkatesaya, Jaya Janaki Nayaka, Aakatayi| 
|-
| 2016 || Dictator, Nenu Sailaja, Soggade Chinni Nayana, Seethamma Andalu Ramayya Sitralu, Oopiri, Sardaar Gabbar Singh, Eedo Rakam Aado Rakam, Sarrainodu, Supreme, A Aa, Oka Manasu, Janatha Garage, Majnu|| Nominated—IIFA Utsavam Best Lyricist for Janatha Garage|-
| 2015 || Srimanthudu, S/O Satyamurthy, Raghuvaran B.tech, Baahubali: The Beginning, Bhale Bhale Magadivoy, Bruce Lee – The Fighter, Cheekati Rajyam (2015; also actor "Subba Rao")
||
|-
| 2014 || Legend|| 
|-
| 2013 || Vishwaroopam (Dubbed version), Attharintiki Daaredhi, Mirchi, Baadshah, Iddarammayilatho||
|-
| 2012 || Bodyguard, Mr. Nokia, Julayi, Sudigadu, Damarukam, Endukante... Premanta!, Eega|| Nominated—SIIMA Award for Best Lyricist (Telugu) for Eega Eega Eega|-
| 2011 || Adhurs, Panjaa, Solo, Mogudu, Oosaravelli, Madatha Kaja, Dookudu, Kandireega, Dhada, Veera, 100% Love, Mr. Perfect, Theenmaar, Shakti, Aha Naa Pellanta||
|-
| 2010 || Ragada, Kalyanram Kathi, Baava, Brindavanam, Mahesh Khaleja, Don Seenu, Maryada Ramanna, Shubhapradam, Manmadha Banam|| Won— Filmfare Award for Best Lyricist – Telugu for Khaleja.
|-
| 2009 || Malli Malli ||
|-
| 2008 || King ||As "Shastri" assistant of Brahmanandam.
|-
|}

Awards
Won Filmfare Award for Best Lyricist - Telugu  for Khaleja (2010)
Won Filmfare Award for Best Lyricist - Telugu for Janatha Garage (2016)
Won CineMAA Award for Best Lyricist  for Endukante... Premanta! (2012)
2021: SIIMA Award for Best Lyricist (Telugu) for ''Butta Bomma'' - Ala Vaikunthapurramuloo (2021)
2017: SIIMA Award for Best Lyricist (Telugu) for ''Pranaamam'' - Janatha Garage (2016)
 2012: SIIMA Award for Best Lyricist (Telugu) for "Guruvaram March" - Dookudu (2011)
 Nandi Award for Best Lyricist for the song "Srimanthuda" from the movie Srimanthudu in 2015
 Nandi Award for Best Lyricist for the song "Pranaamam Pranaamam" from the movie Janatha Garage'' in 2016

References

External links
 

Living people
1970 births
Telugu-language lyricists
Telugu screenwriters
People from Guntur district
Film musicians from Andhra Pradesh
Screenwriters from Andhra Pradesh
21st-century Indian composers
Telugu film score composers
South Indian International Movie Awards winners
Filmfare Awards South winners
Nandi Award winners